This list of presidents of Ohio State University includes all who have served as university presidents of Ohio State University since its founding in 1870. Ohio State University is a public research university in Columbus, Ohio. Founded in 1870, as a land-grant university and ninth university in Ohio with the Morrill Act of 1862, the university was originally known as the Ohio Agricultural and Mechanical College. In 1878, in light of its expanded focus, the college permanently changed its name to The Ohio State University.

History
The first president of Ohio Agricultural and Mechanical College is Edward Orton, Sr. who served from 1873 to 1881. During Orton's term, the university became Ohio State University, in 1878. Karen A. Holbrook took office in 2002 and was the first female president. E. Gordon Gee is the only president who served two terms after from serving from 1990 to 1998 and returning in 2007-2013. Michael V. Drake, former chancellor of the University of California, Irvine, assumed the role of university president on June 30, 2014. Drake also serves as the first African American President of the University. On June 3, 2020, it was announced that Kristina M. Johnson, the chancellor of State University of New York, will be taking over as the 21st president. She was the first member of the LGBT community to openly serve in the position.

Presidents of Ohio Agricultural and Mechanical College

Presidents of The Ohio State University

Presidents by tenure

Notes or references

 
Ohio State University